Japan Farmers Party (Nihon Nōmintō) may refer to:

Japan Farmers Party (1926–28)
Japan Farmers Party (1947–49)